Shalom Brune-Franklin (born 18 August 1994) is an English-Australian actress known for playing Private Maisie Richards in the BBC series Our Girl, Umm Khulthum in The State and Aoife in the Australian series Doctor Doctor.

She stars as DC Chloe Bishop in all seven episodes of BBC One's Line of Duty, series six (2021) and plays one of the lead roles in The Tourist on BBC One (2022).

Biography
Shalom Brune-Franklin was born in St Albans in England to a Mauritian mother and Thai-born English father. When Brune-Franklin was 14, she moved with her parents and her younger brother, Siam, to Mullaloo, Western Australia. She holds both British and Australian citizenship.

Early acting career
During her studies at Ocean Reef Senior High School, Brune-Franklin took up drama class then went on to win the school's drama award for high achievement. Brune-Franklin enrolled to study journalism at the Edith Cowan University but after seeing the Western Australian Academy of Performing Arts (WAAPA) she decided to propel her acting career. Brune-Franklin got an audition at the WAAPA and then later that year won most outstanding student.

Acting credits

Film

Television

Theatre

References

External links

1994 births
Living people
21st-century Australian actresses
21st-century English actresses
21st-century English people
21st-century English women
Actresses from Hertfordshire
Australian people of Mauritian descent
Australian television actresses
British emigrants to Australia
English people of Mauritian descent
English television actresses
People from St Albans
Western Australian Academy of Performing Arts alumni